Darryl Gibson (born July 28, 1976 in Toronto, Ontario) is a Canadian lacrosse coach and former professional player. He played for the Albany Attack, Toronto Rock, San Jose Stealth, Arizona Sting, Minnesota Swarm, Chicago Shamrox and Buffalo Bandits the National Lacrosse League. Gibson is now an Assistant Coach for the Albany FireWolves.

Gibson's son Tyson is also a professional lacrosse player currently playing for the Colorado Mammoth.

Statistics

NLL
Reference:

References

1979 births
Living people
Albany FireWolves coaches
Arizona Sting players
Canadian lacrosse players
Chicago Shamrox players
Buffalo Bandits players
Lacrosse people from Ontario
Minnesota Swarm players
San Jose Stealth players
Sportspeople from Toronto
Toronto Rock players